Braian Alejandro Galván (born 6 October 2000) is an Argentine professional footballer who plays as a midfielder for Major League Soccer club Colorado Rapids.

Club career
Galván had a spell with Estudiantes in his youth career, which preceded him joining Colón. He got his senior career going with the club in December 2017, making his professional debut for the Argentine Primera División team during a defeat at home to Talleres; having previously been an unused substitute in August against Rosario Central. His first goal arrived in November 2019 during a 3–2 victory over Estudiantes.

On 16 January 2020, it was announced that Galván would join MLS side Colorado Rapids on 7 July 2020. Galván made his Rapids debut on 22 July in a 2–2 draw against Minnesota United at the MLS is Back Tournament. Galván scored his first goal in Burgundy in Colorado's 5–0 win over Real Salt Lake on 12 September as they reclaimed the Rocky Mountain Cup. Galván earned his first assist with Colorado for Jonathan Lewis' goal in the Rapids' 2–0 victory over LA Galaxy on 19 September. Galván finished his first season with one goal and one assist in ten appearances, including in Colorado's first-round playoff loss at Minnesota.

In February 2022, Galván underwent a successful surgery on his right knee.

International career
In 2018, Galván was called up by the Argentina U20s to train against the senior side during the 2018 World Cup in Russia.

Personal life
In December 2020, Galván married his wife, Maria.

Career statistics

References

External links

2000 births
Living people
Sportspeople from San Miguel de Tucumán
Argentine footballers
Association football midfielders
Argentine expatriate footballers
Expatriate soccer players in the United States
Argentine expatriate sportspeople in the United States
Argentine Primera División players
Club Atlético Colón footballers
Colorado Rapids players
Major League Soccer players